Ruch may refer to:

Settlements
Ruch, Gironde, a commune in France
Ruch, Oregon, an unincorporated community in Jackson County, Oregon
Ruch-e Olya, a village in Qazvin Province, Iran
Ruch-e Sofla, Qazvin, a village in Qazvin Province, Iran

In Poland
One of the meanings of ruch in Polish is movement.

Sport
Ruch Chorzów, a football club from Poland
Ruch Radzionków, a football club from Poland
Ruch Wysokie Mazowieckie, a football club from Poland
Ruch Zdzieszowice, a football club from Poland

Organisations
Prasa-Książka-Ruch, a state-owned newspaper monopoly in communist Poland
 Ruch catalog (Ilustrowany Katalog Znaczków Polskich), catalogue of postage stamps
Ruch Narodowy, a Polish far-right political party
Ruch Palikota, a former Polish political party
Ruch (organisation), a former Polish underground organisation

People
Notable people with the surname Ruch include:
 Angela Ruch (born 1983), American stock car racing driver
 Charlie Ruch (1862–1937), American businessman, owner and president of the Philadelphia Phillies from 1930 to 1932
 Daniel Ruch (born 1983), American soccer coach
 Dave Ruch (born 1964), American performer and teaching artist
 Günter Ruch (1956–2010), German writer and politician
 Hans Ruch (1898–1947), German footballer
 John Ruch (1834–1912), member of the Wisconsin State Assembly
 Peter Ruch (born 1941), Swiss Olympic shooter
 Stewart E. Ruch III (consecrated 2013), American Anglican bishop

Other uses
Ruch (river), Perm Krai, Russia
Ruching, a technique for gathering fabric

See also

Rusch, a surname